Shanhe is a town under the administration of Zhengning County, Gansu, China. , it has 2 residential communities and 11 villages under its administration.

References 

Township-level divisions of Gansu
Zhengning County